Alontsevo is a rural locality (a selo) in Zavyazenskoye Rural Settlement, Kikvidzensky District, Volgograd Oblast, Russia. The population was 213 as of 2010. There are 3 streets.

Geography 
Alontsevo is located on Khopyorsko-Buzulukskaya plain, on the Zavyazka River, 20 km north of Preobrazhenskaya (the district's administrative centre) by road. Zavyazka is the nearest rural locality.

References 

Rural localities in Kikvidzensky District